Love in the Time of Money is a 2002 American romantic comedy-drama film written and directed by Peter Mattei, and starring Steve Buscemi, Vera Farmiga, Rosario Dawson, Malcolm Gets, Jill Hennessy, and Adrian Grenier. The film, executive produced by Robert Redford, premiered at the Sundance Film Festival on January 11, 2002. It had a limited release in the United States on November 1, 2002.

Production began in New York City on January 29, 2000.

Plot
New York serves as a backdrop for a cast of characters in search of love, lust or lucre including a woman who makes awkward moves on the man renovating her SoHo loft, an embezzler, a sleazy artist and a phone psychic.

Cast
 Steve Buscemi as Martin Kunkle
 Vera Farmiga as Greta
 Rosario Dawson as Anna
 Malcolm Gets as Robert Walker
 Adrian Grenier as Nick
 Jill Hennessy as Ellen Walker
 Carol Kane as Joey
 Michael Imperioli as Will
 Domenick Lombardozzi as Eddie Iovine
 Nahanni Johnstone as Marianne Jones
 Alexa Fischer as Elaine
 Ross Gibby as Jack
 John Ottavino as Mark Jones
 Tamara Jenkins as Gallery Owner

Reception

Critical response
The film received a mostly negative response from film critics. On review aggregator website Rotten Tomatoes, the film holds an 18% approval rating, based on 39 critical reviews, with an average rating of 4.2/10. A. O. Scott of The New York Times wrote, "Mr. Mattei's use of digital video, his fondness for extreme close-ups and his balky, fumbling dialogue were clearly meant to give Love in the Time of Money a rough, naturalistic feel. But those techniques only highlight the film's artificiality, making you gratingly aware of how much has been left out and how much of the drama is based on secondhand assumptions rather than genuine insight."

Lisa Schwarzbaum of Entertainment Weekly wrote, "It's not about love. It's not about money. It's not even about sex, although the transaction of cold, love-starved sexual business propels the daisy-chain encounters that make up Love in the Time of Money. If anything, theater director Peter Mattei's dingy, mannered, visually ragged resetting of Max Ophuls' unimprovable 1950 beaut La Ronde (based on an 1896 play by Arthur Schnitzler) is about scenes of cap-A acting by a roundup of cap-I indie thespians, captured on brutally flat and blotchy cap-DV digital video."

Duane Byrge of The Hollywood Reporter wrote, "Despite the evocative aesthetics evincing the hollow state of modern love life, the film never percolates beyond a monotonous whine."

Accolades

External links

References

2002 films
2002 romantic comedy-drama films
American romantic comedy-drama films
Films shot in New York City
Films scored by Theodore Shapiro
2000s English-language films
2000s American films